Muruga Booker has played on many different recordings by a wide variety of artists including Weather Report, Bob Dylan, James Gurley, Tim Hardin,
Al Kooper, Mitch Ryder, George Clinton, Bootsy Collins, David Peel, Babatunde Olatunji, Jerry Garcia, Merl Saunders, Buzzy Linhart and many more.  He has appeared on albums released by A&M, Bear Family Records, Capitol Records, Chesky Records, Columbia Records, Elektra, Grateful Dead Records, P-Vine, Paramount Records, RCA Records, Relix Records, Uncle Jam and Verve Forecast, among others. He has also self-released many recordings on his own Musart record label through Bandcamp.

Discography 
 1961 - Low Rocks - Blueberry Jam / Midnight Tears (single)
 1962 - Low Rocks - Snooker (Like Pool) (single)
 1964 - Jim and Jean - Changes
 1965 - The Spike Drivers - I'm So Glad and Can't Stand The Pain (singles)
 1966 - Jim and Jean - People World
 1968 - Paul Winter Consort - Something in the Wind
 1969 - Swami Satchidananda - Swami Satchidananda
 1970 - Muruga Booker - Blue Hill Ocean Dance
 1971 - Allen Ginsberg and Bob Dylan sessions - The Record Plant, New York, NY - Engineer - Jack Douglas (November 17, 1971)
 1971 - The Rainbow Band - The Rainbow Band
 1971 - Muruga - Rama Rama - Endless Path
 1972 - Ursa Major - Ursa Major (with Dick Wagner)
 1972 - Darius Brubeck - Chaplin's Back (with Michael Brecker,  Amos Garrett, Perry Robinson and Richard Bock)
 1972 - Gunter Hampel & His Galaxie Dream Band - Angel
 1973 - Al Kooper - Naked Songs
 1973 - Weather Report - Sweetnighter
 1974 - Weather Report - Mysterious Traveller
 1975 - Larry Nozero (Featuring Dennis Tini) - Time (as Muruga Sharma)
 1975 - Allen Ginsberg - First Blues: Rags, Ballads & Harmonium Songs 1971 - 1974 (with Bob Dylan)
 1976 - Michael Henderson - Solid
 1978 - David Peel and Death - King of Punk
 1978 - Michael Moss  / Four Rivers - Cross Current
 1978 - Mitch Ryder - How I Spent My Vacation
 1979 - David Peel and Death - Junk Rock / I Hate You (single) (with Wayne Kramer)
 1980 - David Peel and the Death-O-Lettes - Death To Disco
 1981 - Funkadelic - The Electric Spanking of War Babies
 1982 - Muruga Booker - Do It
 1982 - George Clinton - Computer Games
 1982 - Godmoma- Here (with Bootsy Collins)
 1983 - Steven Bookvich & Anthony Kabbabie - Bay of Your Dreams
 1983 - George Clinton - You Shouldn't-Nuf Bit Fish
 1983 - P-Funk All Stars - Urban Dance Floor Guerillas
 1984 - Muruga & The Soda Jerks - Boogie With You (single)
 1985 - George Clinton - Some of My Best Jokes Are Friends
 1986 - David Peel & The Muruga Experience - Animal In Love
 1986 - Muruga Booker - Little Nada Drummer Boy
 1986 - Muruga Booker - Terroristic Activity
 1990 - Prem Das, Muruga, Shakti And Silve – Sonando Tambores (Dreaming Drums)
 1990 - Merl Saunders and The Rainforest Band - Blues From the Rainforest (with Jerry Garcia)
 1991 - Prem Das & Muruga - Ecstasy
 1992 - Merl Saunders and The Rainforest Band - Save the Planet So We'll Have Someplace to Boogie
 1992 - Muruga & Shakti - The Sacred Drum
 1992 - Muruga U.F.M. (Unified Field Marshals) - Rock The Planet
 1993 - George Clinton - Hey Man, Smell My Finger
 1993 - George Clinton and the P-Funk All Stars - Testing Positive 4 The Funk
 1993 - Relix Records Bay Rock Sampler #5 - Murgua UFM - Thought Of You
 1994 - Sikiru Adepoju, Muruga, Babatunde Olatunji - Cosmic Rhythm Vibrations
 1994 - Allen Ginsberg - Holy Soul Jelly Roll: Poems & Songs(with Bob Dylan and Happy Traum)
 1994 - FOOM - Earth Sauce
 1995 - P-Funk All Stars - Dope Dogs
 1995 - P-Funk All Stars - Hydraulic Funk
 1995 - Low Rocks – Blueberry Jam / Midnight Tears (Get Hip Archive Series)
 1995 - David Peel & the Lower East Side - Up Against the Wall
 1996 - Thunder Rocks - On the Rampage
 1998 - Various Artists - The Sabre Records Story
 1998 - Merl Saunders & the Rainforest Band - Fiesta Amazonica
 2001 - Muruga GVCB Global Village Ceremonial Band - God Bless America - Find The Love & Peace Inside
 2002 - Dennis K. Chernin, Muruga Booker - How to Meditate Using Chakras, Mantras, and Breath
 2002 - Spike Drivers - Folkrocking Psychedelic Innovation From The Motor City In The Mid 60s
 2003 - Muruga & The Global Village Ceremonial Band - One Global Village
 2003 - David Peel - Rock 'N' Roll Outlaw: The Apple and Orange Recordings (16-CD box set)
 2003 - Global Jazz Trio - White Christmas Holiday Jazz & Spirits
 2003 - Buzzy Linhart - Presents the Big Few
 2004 - Global Jazz Trio - Live at The Ark / Music, Books, Coffee Crossings & Borders
 2005 - Babatunde Olatunji - Circle of Drums
 2005 - Free Funk - Free Funk
 2005 - Global Jazz Trio - Live in Detroit: Global Jazz Trio at Baker's Keyboard Lounge
 2005 - Swami Satchidananda - The Woodstock Years
 2006 - Muruga & The Global Village Ceremonial Band - Muruga & The Global Village Ceremonial Band
2006 - Brian Curtin - I've Got A Joke for You!
 2007 - Muruga / Robinson Dyad -  Bubble Waves
 2007 - George Kerby - Out of the Corridor
 2008 - Northwoods Improvisers, Faruq Z. Bey, Muruga, Arthur Doyle, Acid Birds - Velvet Box
 2009 - Global Jazz Project - Out Of This World: Live At The 30th Annual Detroit International Jazz
 2009 - Peter Walker - Long Lost Tapes 1970
 2009 - Global Jazz Project - Global Visions
 2009 - Global Jazz Project - Tour of the Planet
 2010 - Muruga Booker & Ralph Koziarski - Solstice Trance Mission
 2010 - Various Artists - Qbico U-nite VI VII, Detroit Buffalo, USA
 2011 - Muruga Free Funk - Back 2 The Tribe
2011 - Prem Das, Muruga, Shakti – Journey Of The Drums (cleaned and remastered)
 2012 - Muruga Booker, Pandit Samir Saha, John Churchville - Joty Drums
 2013 - Muruga & The Cosmic Hoedown Band - Changing The Sound of Your Room
 2013 - Muruga Booker & Perry Robinson - The Muruga - Perry Box
 2013 - Woodstock 40 Years On: Back to Yasgur's Farm (with Tim Hardin)
 2014 - The New Newz - Deer Dreamers
 2014 - The Muruga Band - Michigan Mud
 2014 - David Leikam, Muruga Booker - After the Ice Cream
 2015 - Various Artists - Michigan Box - 1950s & 1960s Oddball Labels (The Low Rocks, The Thunder Rocks) 
 2015 - Muruga & The Cosmic Hoedown Band meet George Clinton & P-Funk All-Stars - The Fathership - Mothership World Connection
 2016 - Harmonium - Inner Galactic Flow
 2016 - Harmonium - Inner Excursion
 2016 - Harmonium - Synthonic Nada Boom
 2016 - Muruga & The Cosmic Hoedown Band - Harmonious World
 2016 - Muruga & The Global Village Ceremonial Band - Stop Chaos & Step Into Paradise
 2016 - Muruga Booker - TEKYES
 2016 - The Muruga Band - Mystic World
 2016 - Muruga Booker - Untrapped Drums
 2016 - Muruga & The Worms - Muruga & The Worms (with James Gurley)
 2016 - Muruga Booker - Funky Space Drum
 2016 - Muruga Booker - Muruga (originally on cassette 1980's, Digital release)
 2016 - Perry Robinson & Muruga Booker - Essence
 2016 - Peter Walker & Muruga Booker - Spirit Callers
 2016 - priest muruga booker the least - Spirit Rock Revival
 2016 - Priest Steven Muruga Booker - Priest Steven Speaks
 2016 - Priest Steven Muruga Bookvich & Alex Terzian - Kiss of Peace
 2016 - Muruga Blues Band - Fool's Blues
 2016 - T (Featuring Muruga & Madcat Ruth) - Deer Camp (single)
 2016 - The ORIGINAL Global Village Ceremonial Band - Art-Official Intelligence
 2016 - Muruga Booker - Trance Pulsations
 2016 - Wormhole Cafe (feat. P-Funk All-Stars & more) - At The Wormhole Cafe
 2016 - Muruga, Tom and The Foreign Twoglets - Pigdeeroo
 2017 - Booker Blues All Stars - Booker Plays Hooker
 2017 - Muruga Booker - Bio-Harmonic Rhythms
 2017 - Muruga Booker - Memory Eternal (A Drum Vigil for Merl Saunders)
 2017 - Mighty Michael, Peter Madcat Ruth, Muruga Booker - Passing The Torch
 2017 - Muruga Booker & Mark Hershberger - Sound Games
 2017 - Rick Jacobi - Night Shift
 2017 - Muruga Booker - Sound Med Vol. 1
 2017 - Spacecraft - Launch
 2017 - The Priest Band - There is a Light
 2017 - Worlds Within - Down Home in The Cosmos
 2017 - Muruga & The Global Village Ceremonial Band - One Global Village (remastered)
 2017 - Muruga & The Global Village Ceremonial Band - Muruga & The Global Village Ceremonial Band (remastered)
 2017 - Muruga & The Microtones - Spirit Jam

References 

Discographies of American artists